Letters from Birmingham is the fifth studio album by R&B-pop artist and American Idol winner Ruben Studdard the album was released on March 13, 2012. Produced by Elvis "BlacElvis" Williams, Harold Lilly, Patrick "Guitarboy" Hayes.  Horns by Siraaj Amnesia James (Encore).

Track listing
"Letter 1"
"Turn You Out"
"Love Skies 1"
"Wear Me"
"Letter #2"
"Pure Imagination"
"Do It Right" (featuring Chrisette Michele)
"Today! (Hallelujah)"
"Letter #3"
"Twisted Love"
"Rock Witcha" (featuring K. Michelle)
"All About You"
"Letter #4"
"Her 4 U"
"What's the Reason"
"June 28th (I'm Single)"
"Loving You Is Killing Me" (Best Buy Bonus Track)
"For Both Of Us I'l Be Concerned" (Best Buy Bonus Track)
"What A Day" (Best Buy Bonus Track)
"Leading Lady" (Best Buy Bonus Track)

References

2012 albums
Ruben Studdard albums
Shanachie Records albums